Someday is the first gospel album by the American musician Crystal Gayle, released in 1995. It received a nomination for Best Southern, Country or Bluegrass Gospel Album at the Grammy Awards. Gayle had intended for years to do a gospel album, considering it to be a country music tradition.

Critical reception

The Orange County Register wrote that Gayle uses "a top-notch band, smart arrangements and her beautiful soprano to deliver an album that will satisfy listeners from the country music ranks as well as those who enjoy the religious works of Amy Grant and Stephen Curtis Chapman."

Track listing

Personnel
Bruce Bouton - steel guitar
Mark Casstevens - acoustic guitar, mandolin
Mike Chapman - bass guitar
Mike Eldred - background vocals
Jim Ferguson - bass guitar, background vocals
Joy Gardner - background vocals
Bill Gatzimos - background vocals
Crystal Gayle - lead vocals, background vocals
Rob Hajacos - fiddle
Chris Leuzinger - acoustic guitar, electric guitar
Jay Patten - saxophone
Allen Reynolds - background vocals
Tom Roady - congas, tambourine
Milton Sledge - drums
Bobby Wood - Hammond organ, piano, synthesizer, background vocals
Peggy Sue Wright - background vocals
Sonny Wright - background vocals

References

Crystal Gayle albums
Albums produced by Crystal Gayle
1995 albums